Polish New Zealanders refers to New Zealand citizens or residents of full or partial Polish ancestry, or Polish citizens living in New Zealand. The 2018 census counted 2,871 New Zealanders who claim Polish ancestry.

History

Small numbers of Polish people began to arrive to New Zealand throughout the 19th century. Among these, many were among the "Brogdenites" employed to build stretches of New Zealand's main railway lines. Many of these settled in small towns close to the rail line such as Greytown (now Allanton) in Otago.

During World War I and World War II, many Polish people became refugees and were relocated to other countries such as New Zealand.

Notable Polish New Zealanders

 John Blumsky
 Mark Blumsky
 Krzysztof Pawlikowski
 Helen Schamroth
 Mirosław Złotkowski
 Simon Mercep
 Count Geoffrey Potocki de Montalk
 Dallin Watene-Zelezniak
Łukasz Buda
Zoi Sadowski-Synnott
 Lisa Warrington

See also
 New Zealand–Poland relations
 Polish diaspora

References

 
European New Zealander